"Part-Time Lover" is a song by American R&B singer and songwriter Stevie Wonder, released as the first single from his twentieth studio album, In Square Circle (1985). The song reached number one on the Billboard Hot 100, R&B, dance, and adult contemporary charts, becoming Wonder's final number one hit to date.  The song's simultaneous chart successes made Wonder the first artist to score a number-one hit on four different Billboard charts. The song was also released as a special 12" version. Lyrically, it tells the story of a man who is cheating on his wife with a mistress, only to find out in the end that his wife is cheating on him as well.

"Part-Time Lover" also reached number three on the UK Singles Chart thanks in large part to a performance by Wonder on Top of the Pops in late 1985.

The song featured R&B singer Luther Vandross singing the ad-libs and backing vocals, in addition to Syreeta Wright and Philip Bailey of Earth, Wind and Fire. Wonder earned a Grammy Award nomination for Best Male Pop Vocal Performance in 1986, for the song. Wonder is noted in the liner notes of the 4-CD set Hitsville USA: The Motown Singles Collection Volume 2 1972-1992 as describing the music for the song as an ode to "You Can't Hurry Love" and "My World Is Empty Without You", both by the Supremes, former Motown labelmates of Wonder.

Charts

Weekly charts

Year-end charts

All-time charts

Certifications

Personnel
Stevie Wonder – lead vocal, synthesizers, drums
Luther Vandross – lead vocal, background vocal
Syreeta Wright, Philip Bailey (Earth Wind & Fire), Keith John, Melody McCully, Billy Durham, Peter Byrne (Naked Eyes), Renee Hardaway, Darryl Phinnessee - background vocal

Cover versions
Puerto Rican salsa musician Bobby Valentin covered the song in 1986 which peaked at number 23 on the Hot Latin Tracks chart.

See also
List of RPM number-one singles of 1985
List of number-one singles of 1985 (Ireland)
List of number-one singles in 1985 (New Zealand)
List of Hot 100 number-one singles of 1985 (U.S.)
List of number-one R&B singles of 1985 (U.S.)
List of number-one adult contemporary singles of 1985 (U.S.)
List of number-one dance singles of 1985 (U.S.)

References

External links
 

1985 songs
1985 singles
Stevie Wonder songs
Billboard Hot 100 number-one singles
Cashbox number-one singles
RPM Top Singles number-one singles
Irish Singles Chart number-one singles
Number-one singles in New Zealand
Songs written by Stevie Wonder
Dance-pop songs
Tamla Records singles
The Lost Fingers songs
Songs about infidelity
American synth-pop songs
Song recordings produced by Stevie Wonder